Warehouse is a song by Dave Matthews Band which was released on their first studio album, Under the Table and Dreaming. A live performance of the song was also released on their early EP Recently. This song ranks near the top of the list in terms of all time fan favorites. It’s been played since the very beginning and has remained a highlight of nearly every show in which it is played.

Versions
In the early days of 92-93, the song frequently featured a "Shortnin' Bread" interpolation towards the end of the song. After the summer of 1994, the last verse evolved beyond the mere repetition of "That's my blood down there". Starting in 1995, a stop-time intro began to occasionally be played during full-band versions. In 1999, fans from the original nancies mailing list began organizing to chant "Woo!" during the stop-time intro. By the summer of 2000, the "Woos" caught on and are now a standard crowd chant at the start of every Warehouse featuring the stop-time intro. However the show on June 19, 2010 at the Verizon Wireless Music Center in Noblesville, Indiana, the song started with a lyrical intro by Dave and did not have the distinctive "Wooing." The distinctive stop-time intro has also been used by the Washington Capitals as a call and response with fans at the Verizon Center.

Dave Matthews and Tim Reynolds versions have continued to contain the original intro, as well as a "Passion" Intro where Dave interpolates the vocal chords from Peter Gabriel's Passion. Starting in 2003, the jam evolved into what has come to be known as the 'salsa jam' outro with a more celebratory salsa vibe. Throughout the band's history, Warehouse has also appeared on the heels of the song "Dancing Nancies" in live setlists, and more often than not when this is the case, the two songs are segued together, as can be heard on the release Live at Red Rocks 8.15.95.

Though the song was not released as a single, the song had gained immense popularity in its live performances. When it is performed live, it often will have an additional jam added into the middle of the song with a salsa feel to it. This part also borrows a rhythmic pattern originally seen in live performances of "Typical Situation." Dave will often open the song with an extended intro, where he improvises a middle-eastern sounding wail over the minor chord theme of the song, rising in intensity until the main song begins. Another opening frequently used in live performances catches the audience off guard by exploding into the theme chords under bright flashing strobe lights. Live performances of this song have been released on many Dave Matthews Band live albums, such as The Central Park Concert, The Gorge, Live Trax Vol. 6, and Live at Piedmont Park. A live version was also featured on the Dave Matthews Band compilation album The Best of What's Around Vol. 1. Occasionally there is an interpolation of the song Louie Louie near the end of the song. This rendition can be heard on the Live Trax Vol. 6.

References

Dave Matthews Band songs
1994 songs
Salsa songs
Songs written by Dave Matthews
Song recordings produced by Steve Lillywhite